Belgium is a European country with a Jewish population of approximately 35,000 out of a total population of about 11.4 million. It is among the countries experiencing an increase in both antisemitic attitudes and in physical attacks on Jews.

According to Jeffrey Goldberg, the contemporary situation stands in contrast with the post-war decades, which were marked by a public consensus that antisemitism is morally wrong.

1980s through early 2000s
The 1980s were marked by a number of anti-Jewish attacks, the most notorious being the deadly 1980 Antwerp summer camp attack on families waiting with their children for a bus that would carry them to a Jewish summer camp. This attack was part of a wave of attacks on Jewish targets worldwide that included the synagogue in Copenhagen, the bombing of a synagogue in Paris, the 1981 Vienna synagogue attack, attacks on a synagogue in Johannesburg, South Africa in 1983, attacks on synagogues in Buenos Aires and Rosario Argentina in 1984, an attack on a Jewish film festival in Paris in 1985, the 1982 Great Synagogue of Rome attack, and the 1981 Antwerp bombing in which three people were killed and over 100 wounded.

In April 2002, the facade of the Charleroi synagogue was sprayed with bullets. In 2003 a 33-year-old man of Moroccan descent parked a car alongside the synagogue of Charleroi,  poured gasoline over the car, and set it alight in an attempt to destroy the synagogue. Authorities investigated it as possible terrorism. Prime Minister Guy Verhofstadt condemned the attack but stated that he saw no need to raise security around Jewish institutions in Belgium. Firefighters were able to douse the fire before it destroyed the building.

Post 2012
According to a JTA report, the number of antisemitic incidents in 2012 was the highest since 2009. 80 antisemitic incidents were reported throughout Belgium in 2012, a 23% increase from 2011 and an overall increase of 34% since 2000. Five of the incidents involved physical attacks, three of which occurred in Antwerp.

In October 2013, Isi Leibler, the former president of the Executive Council of Australian Jewry, reported on the alarming increase in the levels of antisemitism in Belgium. Leibler described a wide use of antisemitic caricatures in the media including a caricature on the official central Flanders educational website, comparing Israel to Nazi Germany. In addition, he described an increase of 30% in the number of antisemitic incidents including physical assaults and vandalism of Jewish institutions. Furthermore, according to a survey conducted among eight Jewish communities in eight European Union countries, 88% of Belgium Jews feel that in the course of recent years, antisemitism has intensified in their country. 10% of the Belgian survey respondents reported suffering from incidents of physical violence or threats due to their Jewish affiliation since 2008. Most of the victims did not report the incidents to the police.

2014 was marked by an increased frequency of antisemitic attacks, with antisemitic attacks recorded by the government increasing by 50% over the previous year.  The increase is often dated from the May 2014 Jewish Museum of Belgium shooting. Two days later, a young Muslim man entered the CCU (Jewish Cultural Center) while an event was taking place and shouted racist slurs. A month later, a school bus in Antwerp, that was driving 5-year-old Jewish children was stoned by a group of Muslim teens. Towards the end of August 2014, a 75-year-old Jewish woman was hit and pushed to the ground because of her Jewish-sounding surname.  Belgian politician Hassan Aarab, running for municipal office in Antwerp on the Christian Democratic and Flemish list, publicly apologized for antisemitic statements.

In July 2014, a doctor refused to care for Holocaust survivor Bertha Klein, telling her son "Send her to Gaza for a few hours, then she will get rid of the pain. I’m not coming". The incident was ranked as the worst anti-Semitic incident in 2014 by the Simon Wiesenthal Center.

In 2014 The New York Times reported on crowds of protestors near the European Parliament building in Brussels shouting “Death to the Jews!” On 14 September, a crowd that had gathered in Brussels to dedicate a plaque memorializing the Holocaust was attacked by "youths" hurling rocks and bottles.  On 18 September, a synagogue in the Anderlecht neighborhood was set on fire in a suspected arson attack. These were among a series of incidents, including an ethnically Turkish butcher in Liège who put up a sign stating that he would serve dogs but not Jews, and a commuter train announcement that the next stop would be “Auschwitz” and ordering all Jews to get off, that caused growing numbers of Jews to leave, or to consider leaving Belgium.  The incidents are concentrated in Brussels, where anti-Jewish activity is driven by Muslims, who constitute about a quarter of the population of the city.  In June, the government earmarked $4 million for increased security at Jewish institutions.

In 2015 Prime Minister Charles Michel declared a "zero tolerance policy" towards antisemitism.  His government fired the operator of a government hotline assisting victims of the Brussels bombings; the operator had responded to a call requesting assistance transferring two of the wounded home to Israel by insisting that Israel does not exist.  The number of families moving from Belgium to Israel in 2015 reached a 10-year high.

In 2016 the government-funded, Catholic Sint-Jozefs Institute secondary school in Torhout declared that it was "very proud" of a retired teacher who won a prize for his antisemitic cartoon at the International Holocaust Cartoon Competition in Iran.  Despite a backlash from the Jewish community, the cartoonist was celebrated as a champion of "free speech."
 
In January 2019, Flanders banned the kosher and halal slaughter of animals (schechita), which Jewish and Muslim community leaders denounced as racism and a violation of their freedom of religion. From 1 September, the French-speaking region of Wallonia adopted a similar ban.

In March 2019, a parade float featuring stereotyped Jewish figures at a carnival near Brussels was widely criticised as antisemitic. The float in the town of Aalst, 25 km (15 miles) from the European Parliament, featured grinning figures of Orthodox Jews standing on large piles of money. Local Jewish organisations said it was "typical of Nazism of 1939." The organizers claimed there was "never any intention to insult anyone" and defended it as "a celebration of humor."

In August 2019, Dimitri Verhulst wrote in an op-ed in the newspaper De Morgen that "being Jewish is not a religion, no God would give creatures such an ugly nose.", a quote from French singer Serge Gainsbourg. He also accused Jews of harbouring a superiority complex due to the notion of Jews as the chosen people, and said "talking to the Chosen is difficult" because they unjustly accuse critics of antisemitism. De Morgen's editor-in-chief defended Verhulst on the basis that the op-ed was "a harsh criticism on Israel's politics towards the Palestinian people."

Belgian-Jewish journalist Cnaan Liphshiz has written that what is most troubling about the current state of antisemitism in Belgium is the fact that officials and opinion-shapers have often defended the perpetrators of antisemitic incidents on the grounds of "free speech" or that no offense was supposedly intended. According to Lipshiz, "classic antisemitism" of a type he had thought "impossible in an established Western democracy in the heart of Europe," is now "mainstream" in Belgium.

See also
Antisemitism in contemporary Austria
Antisemitism in contemporary Hungary 
Antisemitism in 21st-century France 
Centre for Equal Opportunities and Opposition to Racism

References

Further reading
Confronting Allosemitism in Europe: The Case of Belgian Jews, Eliezer Ben-Rafael, Brill, 2014
Discrimination and hate crime against Jews in EU Member States: experiences and perceptions of antisemitism. European Union Agency for Fundamental Rights, 2013